The 1928 Mercer Bears football team was an American football team that represented Mercer University as a member of the Southern Intercollegiate Athletic Association (SIAA) during the 1928 college football season. In their third year under head coach Bernie Moore, the team compiled a 3–5–1 record.

Schedule

References

Mercer
Mercer Bears football seasons
Mercer Bears football